The following is a timeline of the history of the city of Little Rock, Arkansas, USA.

18th-19th centuries 

 1722 – French explorer Jean-Baptiste Benard de la Harpe lands near a small rock formation on the south bank of the Arkansas River, which he reputedly names la Petite Roche (the little rock). La Harpe builds a trading post near the little rock. The Quapaw Indians reside nearby.
 1812 – William Lewis, a fur trapper, builds a temporary seasonal home near the little rock.
 1814 - Colonel Edmund Hogan, builds 1st home and ferry at the little rock where the road from Missouri crossed the Arkansas River 
 1815 - Colonel Edmund Hogan is signer of Grand Jury of the county of Arkansas, Territory of Missouri, requesting a company of regular troops be stationed in said county, April, 1816 
 1816–1818 Colonel Edmund Hogan represented Arkansas County in the 3rd Territorial General Assembly of Missouri in 1816 and 1818
 1818 - Colonel Edmund Hogan appointed first justice of Peace of Pulaski county 
 1819 - The Arkansas Gazette established.
 1820
 Jan 1820 Colonel Edmund Hogan sold his ferry and settlement on the Arkansas River at Little Rock to William Russell (The ferry was later owned by first territorial secretary Robert Crittenden) 
 Little Rock is surveyed.
 Robert Crittenden, born 1797, and Chester Ashley, born 1791, enter into an agreement for a "Partnership in the Practice of Law" which lays the groundwork for the Rose Law Firm, the oldest law firm west of the Mississippi River.
 1821
 March 21, 1821, Colonel. Edmund Hogan appointed as Brigadier General of the Arkansas Militia, by U.S. President Monroe.
 Matthew Cunningham arrives in Little Rock.  He is the first physician in the city. 
 Little Rock becomes the capital of the Arkansas Territory formed in 1819; and seat of Pulaski County.
 Arkansas Gazette in publication.
 Little Rock briefly renamed "Arkopolis."
 1825 – Little Rock Tavern in business (approximate date).
 1826- Robert Cunningham, son of Matthew and Eliza, is the first free child born in Little Rock. Records do not survive for births of enslaved persons leaving unclear whether Cunningham was the first child born in the city. 
 1830 – Advocate (Whig) newspaper begins publication.
 1831 – Little Rock is incorporated as a city.
 Dr. Matthew Cunningham is elected the first mayor of Little Rock.  His descendants reside in the city as of 2022.
 1833 – Arkansas State House (now Old State House Museum) is built. Completed in 1842, it serves as the State capitol until 1911.
 1836
 Jesse Brown becomes mayor.
 Arkansas becomes the 25th State, and Little Rock became the official capital city.
 Pulaski County Lyceum active (approximate date).
 1837 – Antiquarian and Natural History Society and Bar Association founded.
 1838 – Steam ferry begins operating.
 1839 – Little Rock Theatre opens.
 1840 – The Tornado newspaper begins publication.
 1841 – Little Rock Arsenal (now MacArthur Museum of Military History) is completed. It serves as a storehouse for U.S. ordnance.
 1843
 Mount Holly Cemetery established.
 William Woodruff's Circulating Library in business.
 1845 – Catholic church built.
 1850 – Population: 2,167.
 1858 – Mechanics' Institute established.
 1859 – St. Johns military college opens.
 1860 – Population: 3,727.
 1861
 U.S. Captain James Totten surrenders Little Rock Arsenal to Governor Henry M. Rector.
 Arkansas joins the Confederacy.
 1863
 Union forces occupy Little Rock.
 Daily Pantograph newspaper begins publication.
 1864 – 17-year-old David Owen Dodd is hanged on January 6 for being a Confederate spy.
 1866 – Little Rock Police Department formed.
 1867 – Mercantile Library founded.
 1868
 Arkansas constitutional convention held.
 Little Rock National Cemetery established.
 1870 – Population: 12,000 (approximate).
 1873
 Baring Cross Bridge constructed.
 Arkansas Press Association headquartered in Little Rock.
 1874
 The Brooks-Baxter War takes place in Little Rock.
 Union Station built. 
 1876
 Horsecar trams begins operating.
 Anthony House (hotel) burns down.
 1877 – Walden Seminary founded.
 1879 – Telephone begins operating per Western Union Telegraph Company.
 1880 – General Douglas MacArthur born on January 26 in The Tower Building of the Little Rock Arsenal. The building is now the home of the MacArthur Museum of Arkansas Military History, and the surrounding area is called MacArthur Park.
 1881 – Little Rock United States Post Office and Courthouse built.
 1882 – Cathedral of St. Andrew built.
 1883
 Mosaic Templars of America founded. 
 Little Rock Electric Light Company begins operating.
 1884
 Waterworks system and Trinity Episcopal Cathedral built.
 Minister's Institute founded.
 1885 – Walnut Grove Methodist Church built.
 1887 – Little Rock Electric Street Railway Company chartered.
 1888 – Electric street lighting installed.
 1890
 Argenta becomes part of city (until 1917).
 Population: 25,874.
 1891 – Electric streetcars begin operating.
 1892 – Fire Department established.
 1897 – Arkansas Federation of Women’s Clubs organized during a meeting in Little Rock.
 1900 – Population: 38,307.

20th century

1900s-1940s 
 1908
 Gazette Building constructed.
 Little Rock College opened.
 1910
 Public library and Royal Theater open.
 Population: 45,941.
 1911 – The current State Capitol building is completed. It is the second building constructed to house the state government, after the Old State House.
 1915
 Little Rock Motor Club active (approximate date).
 Arkansas State Capitol built.
 1916 – Pulaski Heights, one of Little Rock's earliest  western suburbs, is annexed by the city, enabling westward expansion.
 1917
 Little Rock Public Library negro branch opens.
 Little Rock Daily News begins publication.

 1921 – Mopac Station rebuilt.
 1924 – Albert Pike Memorial Temple, and Federal Reserve Bank built.
 1926
 KLRA radio begins broadcasting.
 Little Rock Zoo founded.
 Donaghey Building constructed.
 1927
 Little Rock race riot, May 4, murder suspect John Carter was lynched and his body burned; a white mob of 5,000 rioted in the black business section, destroying many buildings
 Little Rock Junior College and The Arkansas Museum of Natural History and Antiquities established.
 Little Rock Senior High School built.
 KGHI radio begins broadcasting.
 1929
 Dunbar Junior and Senior High School and Junior College established.
 Albert Pike Residence Hotel opens.
 1930
 KARK radio begins broadcasting.
 Little Rock College closed.
 1932 – Travelers Field (ballpark) opens.
 1937
 Urban League and the Museum of Fine Arts founded.
 Arkansas Library Commission headquartered in Little Rock.
 1940 – Population: 88,039.
 1941 – Historic Arkansas Museum opens.
 1947 – City Beautification Forum organized.
 1948 – War Memorial Stadium (Arkansas) opens.

1950s-1990s 

 1950
Arkansas Governor's Mansion built.
Little Rock goes over 100,000 in population within the city and the metropolitan area has 196,000 people.
 1951
 Pratt C. Remmel becomes mayor.
 Pulaski County Historical Society established.
 1953
 KATV (television) begins broadcasting.
 Pulaski County Historical Review begins publication.
 1954 – KARK-TV (television) begins broadcasting.
 1955
 KTHV (television) begins broadcasting.
 Little Rock Air Force Base activated near city.
 1956 – Community Theatre of Little Rock founded.
 1957 – The Little Rock Nine are enrolled at Little Rock Central High School after public protests, and the Arkansas National Guard under the direction of Governor Orval Faubus, prevents their first attempt at enrollment. Arkansas was the third most segregated state in the country at the time (behind Mississippi and Alabama respectively) . President Dwight Eisenhower dispatches federal troops to ensure the students' safety and enforce their right to attend school. These events are collectively referred to as the Crisis at Central High.
 1958 – All three public high schools in Little Rock are closed for one year by Governor Faubus in an attempt to subvert federal efforts to desegregate Arkansas public schools.
 1960 – Arkansas Arts Center founded.
 1964 – Dillard's headquartered in Little Rock.
 1967 – University Mall opens.
Union National Bank subsequently merged into Worthen, which eventually would become part of Bank of America. 
 1971
 Children's Theater founded.
 Heifer International headquartered in city.
The building currently is Arkansas headquarters for Regions Bank.
 1975 – Central Arkansas Library System headquartered in city.
 1976 – Arkansas Repertory Theatre founded.
 1979
 Webster Hubbell becomes mayor.
 Arkansas State Library and Arkansas Census State Data Center headquartered in Little Rock.
 1980 – Population: 158,461.
 1983
 KLRT-TV begins broadcasting.
 Sister city agreement established with Kaohsiung, Taiwan.
 1985
 Decorative Arts Museum opens.
 Pavilion in the Park (shopping centre) in business.
 1986
The skyscraper's name changed to the TCBY Tower later, and became the Metropolitan Tower as of October 2004. It was named the First South building, and then the Rogers building. 
 KJTM-TV (now KASN) begins broadcasting.
 1987 – Lottie Shackelford becomes mayor.
 1990 – Population: 175,795.
 1991
 KLVV radio begins broadcasting.
 The morning Arkansas Gazette and afternoon Arkansas Democrat newspapers merge, commencing publication as the Arkansas Democrat-Gazette.
 1992
 Bill Clinton presidential campaign, 1992 headquartered in city.
 November 3: Bill Clinton is elected President of the United States. He delivers an election night acceptance speech from the front steps of the historic Old State House in downtown Little Rock. He is the first person from the State of Arkansas to be elected president. He was elected to a second term in 1996.
 Sister city agreement established with Hanam, South Korea.
 1994 – Sister city agreement established with Changchun, People's Republic of China.
 1995 – Jim Dailey becomes mayor.
 1997
 Butler Center for Arkansas Studies headquartered in Little Rock.
 40th anniversary of the Crisis at Central High is marked by the opening of a new National Park Service visitor center.
 KVUT (now KARZ-TV) begins broadcasting.
 March 1: An F4 tornado strikes the city's southern and eastern suburbs, killing five (among 15 total deaths throughout the tornado's 27-mile path across Central Arkansas).
 1999
 January 21: An F3 tornado (one of three tornadoes to hit Pulaski County during the broader outbreak) causes severe damage to over 235 buildings in neighborhoods south of downtown, and knocks down several trees on the property of the Arkansas Governor's Mansion; three people died as a result of the storm.
 June 1: American Airlines Flight 1420 crashes after overrunning the runway during landing at Adams Field, killing 11 of the 145 people aboard. 
Acxiom Corporation headquartered in city.
 2000
Little Rock population: 610,518 (core metropolitan area), 785,024 (primary metropolitan area) in 2000 census.

21st century 

 2001 – Friendship city agreement established with Newcastle upon Tyne, England.
 2003
 First Little Rock Marathon is held. Counting the relays, 1,615 runners participate in the  race, making it one of the top 25 races in the nation for 2003.
 Little Rock resident Wesley Kanne Clark, a retired four-star general in the U.S. Army and former Supreme Allied Commander of the North Atlantic Treaty Organization (NATO), announces his intention to run in the presidential primary election for the Democratic Party nomination.
 2004
 William J. Clinton Presidential Center opens with a host of dignitaries and celebrities, such as Governor Mike Huckabee, President George W. Bush, and former presidents George H. W. Bush and Jimmy Carter.
 Arkansas Literary Festival begins.
 River Rail Streetcar begins operating.
 2005 – Jack Stephens Center (arena) opens.
 2006
 The international charitable organization Heifer International dedicates a $17.5 million world headquarters in downtown Little Rock. The organization announces plans to further develop the  location into the Heifer International Center campus.
 The Pulaski County Pedestrian and Bicycle Bridge, nicknamed the Big Dam Bridge, opens to the public.
 A five-year construction boom of mixed-use, high-rise buildings in downtown's historic River Market district began with over 60 stories of residential and retail property and 240 additional hotel rooms developed. Many residential projects were completed during this period such as the Capital Commerce Center (2002), First Security Center (2004), 300 Third Tower (2006), and River Market Tower (2009).
 2007
 Dickey-Stephens Park, home to the Arkansas Travelers minor league baseball team, opens. The ballpark has a capacity of 7,000, and is situated on the Arkansas River in North Little Rock, Arkansas, opposite downtown Little Rock.
 January: Mark Stodola becomes mayor.

 2008
 Mosaic Templars Cultural Center opens.
 Wilson History and Research Center of military headgear founded.
 2010 – Little Rock population: 193,524 (city), 699,757 (core metropolitan area), 877,091 (primary metropolitan area) in 2010 census.
 2011 – Little Rock's record high temperature of 114 degrees Fahrenheit is recorded by the National Weather Service in August.
 2014 – Little Rock's primary metropolitan population is 902,443.
 2015 – French Hill becomes U.S. representative for Arkansas's 2nd congressional district.
 2018 - Frank Scott Jr becomes the first elected African-American mayor of Little Rock

See also 
 List of mayors of Little Rock, Arkansas
 Arkansas in the American Civil War
 National Register of Historic Places listings in Little Rock, Arkansas

References

Bibliography

Published in the 19th century

Published in the 20th century 
 
 
 
 
 . = Chronology
 
 
 Ira Don Richards. Story of a Rivertown: Little Rock in the Nineteenth Century. Benton, AR: 1969.
 Little Rock Handbook. Little Rock: James W. Bell, 1980.
 
 
 
 Hampton F. Roy, Charles Witsell Jr., and Cheryl Griffith Nichols. How We Lived: Little Rock as an American City. Little Rock: August House, 1984.
 Jim Lester and Judy Lester. Greater Little Rock. Norfork, VA: The Donning Company, 1986.
 
 Letha Mills and H. K. Stewart. Little Rock: A Contemporary Portrait. Windson Publications: Chatsworth, CA, 1990.
  (fulltext)

Published in the 21st century 
 
 
 
 C. Fred Williams. Historic Little Rock: An Illustrated History. San Antonio, TX: Historical Pub. Network, 2008.

External links 

 
 Materials related to Little Rock, Arkansas, various dates (via US Library of Congress, Prints & Photos Division)
 Items related to Little Rock, Arkansas, various dates (via Digital Public Library of America).

Little Rock
Little Rock, Arkansas-related lists

Little Rock
Years in Arkansas